Her Hidden Truth is a thriller/drama television film starring Kellie Martin, Antonio Sabato Jr. and Ken Howard. It was directed by Dan Lerner and written by Pamela K. Long, who was also one of the film's producers. The film first aired on Sunday, November 12, 1995 on the National Broadcasting Company Network.

Plot
Young teenager Billie Calhoun is wrongly accused of setting a deadly arson fire that killed her mother and sister. After years in a juvenile detention center, she requests an early release around the age of 18, but it is denied. During the journey back to the center, she escapes the prison van to find the real killer of her mother and sister. Out on her own, she disguises herself and befriends a young cop named Matt Samoni, and together they set out to uncover the truth.

Cast
 Kellie Martin as Billie Calhoun
 Antonio Sabato Jr. as Det. Matt Samoni
 Ken Howard as Jack Devereaux
 Reed Diamond as Clay Devereaux
 Bruce Weitz as Lt. Ricky Levine
 Cindy Pickett as Laney Devereaux
 Gordon Clapp as Father Paul
 Mary Donnelly-Haskell as Dr. Jane Wilson
 Lisa Thornhill as Jean Calhoun
 Red West as Fireman Leon Sykes
 Harold Surratt as Jazz, Lab Tech
 Allison Porter as Young Billie
 Dennis Letts as the Prosecutor
 Diana Taylor as Officer Val Johnson
 David Dwyer as Mr. Gleason
 Levi Frazier Jr. as Chairman Howell

Background
The film stars Kellie Martin as Billie Calhoun, Antonio Sabato Jr. as Det. Matt Samoni and Ken Howard as Jack Devereaux. Others in the film include Reed Diamond as Clay Devereaux, Bruce Weitz as Lt. Ricky Levine, Cindy Pickett as Laney Devereaux and Gordon Clapp as Father Paul.

Today, the film only remains on out-of-print and hard-to-find VHS, released exclusively in the UK via Sony and Odyssey. The release was on May 14, 1997, almost two years after the original American broadcasting. The film has never received a DVD release. In recent times, the movie can often be found unofficially on DVD.

The film's tagline on the UK VHS release reads "Eight years ago Billie was accused of murder, but who really killed her mother?"

The film was filmed in Nashville, Tennessee.Her Hidden Truth'' was created by production companies Ascato TV Inc. and NBC Productions.

Critical reception
Allmovie gave the film two out of five stars.

References

External links
 

1995 television films
1995 films
1990s thriller drama films
NBC network original films
NBC Productions films
1990s English-language films